Teracotona immaculata is a moth in the  family Erebidae. It was described by Wichgraf in 1921. It is found in Angola.

References

Natural History Museum Lepidoptera generic names catalog

Endemic fauna of Angola
Moths described in 1921
Spilosomina